The 4704th Defense Wing  is a discontinued United States Air Force organization.  Its last assignment was with the 25th Air Division of Air Defense Command (ADC) at McChord Air Force Base, Washington, where it was discontinued in 1954.  It was established in 1952 at McChord in a general reorganization of ADC, which replaced wings responsible for a base with wings responsible for a geographical area.  It commanded three fighter interceptor squadrons initially, and added three more squadrons before the end of the year.  In early 1953 it added several radar squadrons in the Pacific Northwest, one of which was an Air National Guard squadron mobilized for the Korean War.  When it was discontinued in the fall of 1954 its units transferred to the 25th Air Division.

History
The wing was organized as the 4704th Defense Wing at the beginning of February 1952, in a major reorganization of ADC responding to ADC's difficulty under the existing wing base organizational structure in deploying fighter squadrons to best advantage. Five days later, the 325th Fighter-Interceptor Wing (FIW) was inactivated and its operational elements, including the 123rd Fighter-Interceptor Squadron (FIS), 317th FIS and 318th FIS, transferred to the 4704th Defense Wing. The support elements of the 325th FIW were transferred from that wing's 325th Air Base Group (ABG) and 325th Maintenance & Supply Group to the 4704th Wing's 567th ABG, which assumed host responsibility for USAF units at McChord. The 317th and 318th FIS at McChord flew Lockheed F-94 Starfire fighter interceptor aircraft, while the 123rd FIS, a Federalized Oregon Air National Guard (ANG) unit, at Portland AFB, flew World War II era F-51 Mustang aircraft. By June, the 123rd had converted to F-86 Sabre aircraft. The Wing's mission was to train and maintain tactical flying units in state of readiness to destroy enemy aircraft in order to defend Northwest United States. It also oversaw the transfer of Air Force facilities at Portland AFB from Tactical Air Command (TAC) to ADC in March 1952. It managed supporting units at McChord AFB for the 25th Air Division, and controlled host support squadrons at dispersed fighter bases.

Additional fighter squadrons were assigned to the wing during 1952.  In March, the 82nd FIS, flying F-94s at Larson AFB, Washington was transferred from the 4703rd Defense Wing in preparation for the transfer of Larson from ADC to TAC.   In August, the 83rd FIS, flying F-89 Scorpion aircraft moved to Paine AFB, WA and was assigned to the wing. At the beginning of November, the 123rd FIS was released back to the ANG and its personnel, mission and equipment were absorbed by the newly activating 357th FIS. A final fighter squadron, the 323d FIS at Larson AFB, which was assigned to the 25th Air Division, was briefly attached to the wing at the end of 1952.

At the beginning of 1953, the wing added the aircraft detection, warning and control mission, when six radar squadrons were assigned to it. ADC again made major organizational changes in February 1953 that affected the wing.  The 567th ABG redesignated as the 567th Air Defense Group and assumed responsibility for command of the 317th and 318th FIS. The 503rd Air Defense Group activated at Portland AFB and the 357th FIS was assigned to it, while the 529th Air Defense Group activated at Paine AFB and the 83rd FIS was assigned to it. Responsibility for ADC units at Larson AFB transferred to the 4702nd Defense Wing. In October 1953, the Federalized 136th Aircraft Control & Warning Squadron (AC&W Sq) of the ANG was returned to the control of the State of Texas and its personnel and equipment transferred to the newly activated 689th AC&W Sq.

The wing was discontinued in 1954 and its equipment and personnel were transferred to other ADC units at McChord.   Its subordinate air defense groups were then assigned directly to the 25th Air Division.

Lineage
 Designated as the 4704th Defense Wing and organized on 1 February 1952
 Discontinued on 8 October 1954

Assignments
 Western Air Defense Force, 1 February 1952
 25th Air Division, 10 December 1952 – 8 October 1954

Components

Groups
 503rd Air Defense Group
 Portland International Airport (formerly Portland AFB), 16 February 1953 – 8 October 1954
 529th Air Defense Group
 Paine Field (formerly Paine AFB), 16 February 1953 – 8 October 1954
 567th Air Base Group (later 567th Air Defense Group), 1 February 1952 – 8 October 1954

Squadrons
Fighter Squadrons

 82d Fighter-Interceptor Squadron
 Larson AFB, WA, 13 March 1952 – 16 February 1953
 83d Fighter-Interceptor Squadron
 Paine AFB, WA, 1 August 1952 – 16 February 1953
 123rd Fighter Interceptor Squadron
 Portland AFB, OR, 6 February 1952 – 1 November 52
 317th Fighter Interceptor Squadron, 6 February 1952 – 16 February 1953
 318th Fighter Interceptor Squadron, 6 February 1952 – 16 February 1953
 323d Fighter-Interceptor Squadron (attached)
 Larson AFB, WA, 26 November 1952 – 19 January 1953
 357th Fighter-Interceptor Squadron
 Portland AFB, OR, 1 November 1952 – 16 February 1953

Support Squadrons
 86th Air Base Squadron
 Paine AFB, WA, 1 February 1952 – 16 February 1953
 89th Air Base Squadron
 Portland AFB, WA, ca. 1 April 1952 – 16 February 1953

Radar Squadrons
 136th Aircraft Control & Warning Squadron
 Portland AFB, OR, 16 February 1953 – 1 October 1953
 635th Aircraft Control and Warning Squadron, 1 January 1953 – 8 October 1954
 689th Aircraft Control & Warning Squadron
 Portland International Airport, OR, 1 October 1953 – 8 October 1954
 757th Aircraft Control and Warning Squadron
 Birch Bay (renamed Blaine AFS), WA, 1 January 1953 – 8 October 1954
 758th Aircraft Control and Warning Squadron
 Neah Bay, OR, 1 January 1953 – 8 October 1954
 759th Aircraft Control and Warning Squadron
 Naselle AFS, OR, 1 January 1953 – 8 October 1954
 761st Aircraft Control and Warning Squadron
 Reedsport (renamed North Bend AFS), OR, 1 January 1953 – 8 October 1954

Stations
 McChord AFB, Washington, 1 February 1952 – 8 October 1954

Commanders
 Col. Alan T. Bennett, 1 February 1952 – ca. 1 January 1953
 Col. Loring F. Stetson, Jr., ca. 1 January 1953 – unknown

Aircraft
 F-84G, 1953
 F-86D, 1953–1954
 F-86F, 1952–1953
 F-89B, 1952–1953
 F-94A, 1952–1954
 F-94B, 1952–1953

See also
 List of MAJCOM wings of the United States Air Force
 List of United States Air Force Aerospace Defense Command Interceptor Squadrons
 List of United States Air Force aircraft control and warning squadrons
 United States general surveillance radar stations

References

Notes

Bibliography

Further reading
 Grant, C.L., The Development of Continental Air Defense to 1 September 1954, (1961), USAF Historical Study No. 126

External links
 4704th Air Defense Wing

4704
Aerospace Defense Command units
Air defense wings of the United States Air Force
Military units and formations established in 1952
Military history of Washington (state)
1952 establishments in Washington (state)
1954 disestablishments in Washington (state)